Methanol dehydrogenase (nicotinoprotein) (NDMA-dependent methanol dehydrogenase, nicotinoprotein methanol dehydrogenase, methanol:N,N-dimethyl-4-nitrosoaniline oxidoreductase) is an enzyme with systematic name methanol:acceptor oxidoreductase. This enzyme catalyses the following chemical reaction

 methanol + acceptor  formaldehyde + reduced acceptor

This enzyme contains Zn2+ and Mg2+.

References

External links 
 

EC 1.1.99